Parliamentary elections were held in Bulgaria on 29 November 1896. The elections were marred by disturbances, particularly in Sofia. The elections were won by the ruling party (the People's Party) led by Prime Minister Konstantin Stoilov.

References

Bulgaria
1896 in Bulgaria
Parliamentary elections in Bulgaria
November 1896 events